Dong Yu may refer to:

 Dong Yu (gymnast), Chinese gymnast
 Dong Yu (footballer) (born 1994), Chinese footballer